Alexander Aetolus (Ἀléxandros ὁ Aἰtōlós) was a Greek poet and grammarian, the only known representative of Aetolian poetry.

Life
Alexander was the son of Satyrus (Σάτυρος) and Stratocleia (Στρατόκλεια), and was a native of Pleuron in Aetolia, although he spent the greater part of his life at Alexandria, where he was reckoned one of the seven tragic poets who constituted the Tragic Pleiad. 
  
Alexander flourished about 280 BC, in the reign of Ptolemy II Philadelphus. He had an office in the Library of Alexandria, and was commissioned by Ptolemy to make a collection of all the tragedies and satyric dramas that were extant. He spent some time, together with Antagoras and Aratus, at the court of Antigonus II Gonatas.

Notwithstanding the distinction Alexander enjoyed as a tragic poet, he appears to have had greater merit as a writer of epic poems, elegies, epigrams, and cynaedi.  Among his epic poems, we possess the titles and some fragments of three pieces: the Fisherman, Kirka or Krika, which, however, is designated by Athenaeus as doubtful, and Helena,  Of his elegies, some beautiful fragments are still extant.<ref>Scholiast and Eustathius, ad Il. iii. 314</ref>  His Cynaedi, or Ionic poems'', are mentioned by Strabo and Athenaeus.  Some anapaestic verses in praise of Euripides are preserved in Gellius.

References

Sources

Further reading
J U Powell (ed), Collectanea Alexandrina: reliquiae minores poetarum graecorum aetatis ptolemaicae, 323–146 A.C. (1972)
Enrico Magnelli (ed), Alexandri Aetoli Testimonia et Fragmenta. Studi e Testi 15. (1999)

Ancient Aetolians
Ancient Greek dramatists and playwrights
Ancient Greek poets
Tragic poets
Ancient Greek epic poets
Ancient Greek epigrammatists
Ancient Greek elegiac poets
3rd-century BC Greek people
3rd-century BC poets
Ptolemaic court
Year of birth unknown
Year of death unknown
Hellenistic poets